The White Highlands is an area in the central uplands of Kenya. It was traditionally the homeland of indigenous Central Kenyan communities up to the colonial period, when it became the centre of European settlement in colonial Kenya, and between 1902 and 1961 was officially reserved for the exclusive use of Europeans by the colonial government.

Name
The first European explorers and administrators used the term Highlands to refer to the region no less than 5,000 feet (1,524 m) above sea level, which was best suited climatically for the Europeans to reside. During the process of settlement, the term came to be used for the areas not already settled by local African tribes. As The Crown Lands Ordinance of 1902 permitted land grants only to Europeans, the Highlands came to mean only the lands Europeans could own and manage.

History

Exploration
To many early explorers and administrators, the cool climate and absence of populations over large swathes of the Highlands, made it a uniquely attractive area for European settlement in sub-tropical Africa. In 1893, the explorer Frederick Lugard, whilst lobbying for a railway in East Africa, noted that European settlement in the region was not feasible until the cooler Highlands were made accessible. This view was echoed by Sir Harry Johnston who, on completion of the Uganda Railway, noted of the Highlands:

Settlement
In 1902, Sir Charles Eliot, then British Commissioner of the Protectorate, encouraged settlement of the Highlands for farming. Commissioner Eliot, a leading critic of building the railway, believed the only way to recoup the money spent on its construction was by opening up the Highlands for farming. In his view, only European settlers and agriculture could develop the region and generate the necessary funds to support  the colonial administration. Eliot's view was supported by pioneer settlers such as The 3rd Baron Delamere and Ewart Grogan, who believed that they had a civilising mission to transform the entire country into a modern industrialised "White Man's Country".

By 1903 there were about 100 European settlers in the Highlands. A large proportion of the settlers hailed from South Africa including 280 Boers from the Transvaal who settled in the Uasin Gishu plateau in 1908.

By 1914, there were around a thousand European settlers in the Highlands. In 1914, around twenty percent of the leases held in the region were held by 13 individuals or groups. The granting of leases to settlers for low prices resulted in rampant land speculation, to the extent that by 1930 approximately sixty five percent of land reserved for Europeans was not under any form of agriculturally productive activity.

Alienation
When European settlement began, the Highlands were primarily inhabited by nomadic pastoralists and this absence of settled agrarian communities allowed British officials to describe the region as uninhabited. At the time, the African population was distributed between cultivating tribes and pastoralist people. The cultivating tribes existed mainly in the high rainfall areas of Nyanza and the slopes at the foot of Mount Kenya such as the Aberdares, Elgeyo and the hills of Ukambani. The intervening areas consisted of extensive but sparsely inhabited plains, at over 5,000 feet, where rainfall was more uncertain and pastoralists instead relied on the grazing of animals. European settlement was predominately in these extensive plains, traditionally inhabited by the Maasai tribe.

At the turn of the century, the Maasai had been decimated by a concurrence of natural disasters. Accompanying a smallpox epidemic was a severe drought and an invasion of locusts which consumed vegetation over large tracts of land, whilst rinderpest had killed large numbers of cattle resulting in starvation within the community. The Maasai entered into treaties with British officials to surrender large amounts of land, which reduced manpower meant they were unable to defend against rival tribes. Of the 12,000 square miles of European settled land, 7,000 consisted of former Masai grazing grounds abandoned under agreements between 1904 and 1913, and large parts of remaining areas, such as the Uasin Gishu plateau, were uninhabited.

British officials also alienated land from other tribes, whom the Maasai had pushed to woodlands on the fringes of the Highlands. These tribes practised shifting cultivation, resulting in large areas of land remaining abandoned for a number of years. Similar disasters as afflicted the Maasai also caused havoc amongst these tribes and, between 1901-02, a famine resulted in the Kikuyu losing between twenty and fifty percent of their population on their frontier with the Maasai. Many survivors sought refuge amongst relatives elsewhere in their domain, but by leaving their land it made the frontier appear disused to European officials. Before the famine, the Kikuyu had been buying up parcels of land in the frontier for individual holdings. As had happened in colonies in North America, when British officials later began paying the Kikuyu for that land, they were acquiring the land freehold under colonial law. However, the Kikuyu were allowed to believe the British were only renting the land until the Kikuyu wished to reclaim it in future, because the transaction had not followed native customs. This difference in cultural understandings of land tenure  was a contributing factor in the Mau Mau Rebellion.

End of reservation
The reservation of the White Highlands for Europeans by administrative practice was ended by the Land Control Regulations in 1961.

Extent
Initially the region was not clearly defined, instead lying between two points on the railway track, namely Kiu and Fort Ternan, and later from Sultan Hamud to Kibigori. It was not until 1939 that the boundaries were defined in the 7th Schedule to The Crown Lands Ordinance under authority of the Kenya (Highlands) Order in Council, 1939. The Order also established a Highlands Board with a majority elected by the Legislative Council to advise and make recommendations on the disposal of land in the region.

Today
Today, the region is at the heart of Kenya's economy. It is the country's best served region by road and rail and has many flourishing cities such as Nairobi, Nakuru, Eldoret, Kitale, Thika, Kericho and Nyeri. Although covering only five percent of Kenya's total land area, it produces most of Kenya's agricultural exports, particularly tea, coffee, sisal and pyrethrum.

References

See also 
East Africa Protectorate
Happy Valley set
Kenya Colony
White people in Kenya
Hugh Cholmondeley, 3rd Baron Delamere

Geography of Kenya
History of Kenya
British Kenya
East Africa Protectorate
European Kenyan
Central Province (Kenya)
Geography of Rift Valley Province

Highlands
Oronyms